Venzy Viegas is an Indian politician and the MLA representing the Benaulim (Goa Assembly constituency) in the Goa Legislative Assembly. He is a member of the Aam Aadmi Party. He was elected as the MLA from Benaulim in the 2022 Goa Legislative Assembly election. He was appointed as the legislative party leader of AAP in Goa Assembly in March 2022.

Career
Venzy Viegas was also appointed the Working President for AAP in May 2022.  He defeated Churchil Alemao (former Chief Minister of Goa) who contested on TMC ticket by a margin of more than 1,000 votes.

Electoral performance

2022 assembly election, Benaulim

References

Living people
Goa MLAs 2022–2027
People from South Goa district
Aam Aadmi Party politicians from Goa
Year of birth missing (living people)